Sir Robert Dove Nicholls (27 June 1889 – 18 January 1970) was an Australian politician who represented the South Australian House of Assembly seats of Stanley from 1915 to 1938 and Young from 1938 to 1956 for the Liberal and Country League and party predecessors. He was one of the two members for Stanley for the entire time it was a two-member seat, and the member for Young for its entire existence. He served a record period as Speaker of the South Australian House of Assembly from 1933 to 1956.

He retired at the 1956 election, after his seat was abolished in a redistribution and he failed to gain preselection for a different seat.

Nicholls was created a knight bachelor in the 1941 New Year Honours for his service as speaker of the assembly.

Personal life
Nicholls' parents were James and Florence Nicholls of Nantawarra. He had four children. He was a prolific lay preacher in the Methodist Church.

See also
Hundred of Nicholls

References

1889 births
1970 deaths
Members of the South Australian House of Assembly
Liberal and Country League politicians
Speakers of the South Australian House of Assembly
20th-century Australian politicians